The 1978 Amateur World Series was the 25th Amateur World Series (AWS), an international men's amateur baseball tournament. The tournament was sanctioned by the International Baseball Federation (which titled it the Baseball World Cup as of the 1988 tournament). The tournament took place in Italy, only the second time outside the Americas, from 25 August to 6 September, and was won by Cubaits 15th AWS victory.

There were 11 participating countries, including first-time participants Belgium and Australia.

Final standings

References
XXV Baseball World Cup Italy (Archived 2009-08-02)

World Cup
Baseball World Cup
1978
Amateur World Series
Amateur World Series
Amateur World Series